Çarşı is a Turkish underground station on the M5 line of the Istanbul Metro in Ümraniye. It is located beneath Alemdağ Avenue and Tunaboyu Street in the Yaman Evler neighborhood of Ümraniye. Connection to IETT city buses is available from at street level.

The station consists of an island platform with two tracks. Since the M5 is an ATO line, protective gates on each side of the platform open only when a train is in the station. Çarşı station was opened on 15 December 2017, together with eight other stations between Üsküdar and Yamanevler.

A second platform for the under construction M12 line is expected to open in the 2020s.

Station Layout

References

Railway stations opened in 2017
Istanbul metro stations
Ümraniye
2017 establishments in Turkey